Sandro Parcaroli (born 28 November 1956) is an Italian entrepreneur and politician.

Career
Member of the right-wing party Lega Nord, he ran for Mayor of Macerata at the 2020 Italian local elections, supported by a centre-right coalition. He was elected at the first round with 52.78% and took office on 24 September 2020.

References

External links
 

1956 births
Living people
Mayors of Macerata
People from Macerata